Robert Joseph Tonyan Jr. (/tʌnjən/ TUN-yun; born April 30, 1994) is an American football tight end for the Chicago Bears of the National Football League (NFL). He played college football at Indiana State and signed with the Detroit Lions as an undrafted free agent in 2017.

Early life
Tonyan attended McHenry Community High School – East Campus. He lettered twice in basketball and football. As a quarterback, he was named all-conference as a junior and senior, and set the school record with 5,000 career passing yards.

College career
Tonyan enrolled at Indiana State in 2012, and started for four years after red-shirting his first year. He appeared in 11 games in 2013, starting three as a quarterback. His first career completion was a 57-yard touchdown, and he completed 35 of 102 passes for 348 yards and three touchdowns. His second year, he moved to wide receiver, where he caught 54 passes for 747 yards (6th in school history) and four touchdowns, including a career-high 172 yards in the last game of the season (seventh in school history). In his 2015 junior season, Tonyan had 40 receptions for 601 yards (fourteenth in school history) and six touchdowns despite starting just six of 11 games, which earned him an honorable mention on the All-Missouri Valley Football Conference team. As a fifth-year senior, Tonyan had 56 receptions for 699 yards (ninth all-time) and a school-record ten touchdowns. He set several career records for the Sycamores, including 20 touchdown receptions, 21 consecutive games with a reception, two games with three receiving touchdowns, and was second all-time to Sam Logan with 150 receptions and 2,047 yards.

Professional career

Detroit Lions
On May 12, 2017, the Detroit Lions signed Tonyan to a three-year, $1.66 million contract as an undrafted free agent. His signing made him the tenth Indiana State football player to reach the NFL. He was released before the season began.

Green Bay Packers
Tonyan was signed to the Packers' practice squad for the final four games of the 2017 season, and was re-signed for the 2018 season. He appeared in the first nine games of the season, but was targeted just once before his first NFL reception, a 54-yard touchdown from Aaron Rodgers against the Seattle Seahawks in Week 11. He totaled four receptions for 77 receiving yards and one touchdown on the 2018 season.

In 2019, the Packers tendered exclusive rights to Tonyan. On December 8, 2019, Tonyan caught a 12-yard pass for a touchdown in a 20–15 win over the Washington Redskins. He totaled ten receptions for 100 receiving yards on the 2019 season.

On April 24, 2020, the Packers re-signed Tonyan as an exclusive-rights free agent, putting him under contract in Green Bay for another year. On September 20, 2020, Tonyan caught an 11-yard touchdown pass in a 42–21 win over the Detroit Lions in Week 2. In a nationally televised Monday Night Football game on October 5, 2020, Tonyan caught six passes for 98 yards, including three touchdown passes, to lead the Packers over the Atlanta Falcons 30–16.
In the NFC Championship against the Tampa Bay Buccaneers, Tonyan recorded 4 catches for 22 yards and a touchdown during the 31–26 loss.

The Packers placed a second-round restricted free agent tender on Tonyan on March 17, 2021. On May 27, Tonyan signed his tender worth $3.4 million. On October 28, 2021, Tonyan tore the ACL in his left knee during the Packers week 8 game against the Arizona Cardinals, forcing him to miss the remainder of the 2021 season. He was placed on injured reserve on November 1, 2021.

On March 20, 2022, Tonyan re-signed with the Packers on a one year contract.

Chicago Bears
On March 16, 2023, Tonyan signed a one-year deal with the Chicago Bears.

NFL career statistics

Regular season

Postseason

References

External links
Chicago Bears bio
Indiana State Sycamores bio

1994 births
Living people
People from McHenry, Illinois
Players of American football from Illinois
Sportspeople from the Chicago metropolitan area
American football tight ends
American football wide receivers
Indiana State Sycamores football players
Detroit Lions players
Green Bay Packers players
Chicago Bears players